Dillagi ... Yeh Dillagi is a long-delayed Bollywood romantic comedy film directed by P. Akash and produced by Ajay S. Bharadwaj under the banner of Krishraj Productions. Featuring actors Dharmendra, Rati Agnihotri and Asrani in key roles, the film also boasts an item number performed by former Indian cricketer Kapil Dev. The story revolves around two families, one of which is an inter-caste. Suresh Raheja composed the film score, while lyrics were written by Sudhakar Sharma.

Cast 
 Dharmendra
 Sakshi Shivanand
 Rati Agnihotri
 Asrani
 Amitabh Dayal
 Asha Varijoshi
 Kapil Dev

Music 
The soundtrack of the film was given by Suresh Raheja. The title song, penned by Sudhakar Sharma, was recorded by Kumar Sanu at Sunny Super Sound Studio.

References

External links 
 Dillagi... Yeh Dillagi at Filmibeat
 

2000s Hindi-language films
Unreleased Hindi-language films